The 2015–16 Furman Paladins men's basketball team represented Furman University during the 2015–16 NCAA Division I men's basketball season. The Paladins, led by third year head coach Niko Medved, played their home games at Timmons Arena and were members of the Southern Conference. They finished the season 19–16, 11–7 in SoCon play to finish in a tie for third place. They defeated UNC Greensboro to advance to the semifinals of the SoCon tournament where they lost to East Tennessee State. They were invited to the CollegeInsider.com Tournament where they defeated Louisiana–Monroe in the first round to advance to the second round where they lost to Louisiana–Lafayette.

Roster

Schedule

|-
!colspan=9 style="background:#6B3FA0; color:#FFFFFF;"| Exhibition

|-
!colspan=9 style="background:#6B3FA0; color:#FFFFFF;"| Regular season

|-
!colspan=9 style="background:#6B3FA0; color:#FFFFFF;"| SoCon tournament

|-
!colspan=9 style="background:#6B3FA0; color:#FFFFFF;"| CIT

References

Furman Paladins men's basketball seasons
Furman
Furman
Furm
Furm